Alicia Molik was the defending champion, but did not compete this year.

Kim Clijsters won the title by defeating Anna-Lena Grönefeld 6–2, 6–4 in the final.

Seeds
The first four seeds received a bye into the second round.

Draw

Finals

Top half

Bottom half

References

External links
 Official results archive (ITF)
 Official results archive (WTA)

2005 Singles
Fortis Championships Luxembourg - Singles
2005 in Luxembourgian tennis